Cortinarius taylorianus is a basidiomycete fungus of the genus Cortinarius native to New Zealand, where it grows under Nothofagus and produces an imposing purple mushroom. This species is named in honour of Grace Marie Taylor, a New Zealand fungi expert.

See also

List of Cortinarius species

References

External links

taylorianus
Fungi of New Zealand
Fungi described in 1990
Taxa named by Egon Horak